Panzerblitz can refer to:
 Panzerblitz, a German antitank missile of World War Two
 PanzerBlitz, a wargame from Avalon Hill